Huang Xuechen (黄雪辰, Huáng Xuěchén, born 25 February 1990) is a Chinese Olympic synchronised swimmer.

Early life
Huang was born in Shanghai on 1990. In 1996, she entered Shanghai Peihua School to start training in swimming and in 2000, she switched to synchronized swimming. In 2002, Huang entered the Shanghai University of Sport.

Career
In 2005, Huang entered the national youth team and in 2006, entered the national team. In 2009, Huang won the third place in the synchronized swimming double free-routine at the 11th National Games in Shandong.

Huang competed in the women's team event at the 2008 Summer Olympics where she won a bronze medal. 

She followed up this success in the women's duet (with Liu Ou) and women's team events at the 2012 Summer Olympics where she won a bronze and silver medal respectively.  At the 2016 Summer Olympics, she won two silver medals, one in the duet (with Sun Wenyan) and one in the team event.

References

External links

Living people
Chinese synchronized swimmers
Olympic synchronized swimmers of China
Synchronized swimmers at the 2008 Summer Olympics
Synchronized swimmers at the 2012 Summer Olympics
Synchronized swimmers at the 2016 Summer Olympics
Synchronized swimmers at the 2020 Summer Olympics
Olympic silver medalists for China
Olympic bronze medalists for China
Olympic medalists in synchronized swimming
Asian Games medalists in artistic swimming
1990 births
Synchronized swimmers from Shanghai
Artistic swimmers at the 2010 Asian Games
Medalists at the 2008 Summer Olympics
Medalists at the 2012 Summer Olympics
Medalists at the 2016 Summer Olympics
Medalists at the 2020 Summer Olympics
Artistic swimmers at the 2014 Asian Games
World Aquatics Championships medalists in synchronised swimming
Synchronized swimmers at the 2007 World Aquatics Championships
Synchronized swimmers at the 2009 World Aquatics Championships
Synchronized swimmers at the 2011 World Aquatics Championships
Synchronized swimmers at the 2013 World Aquatics Championships
Synchronized swimmers at the 2015 World Aquatics Championships
Asian Games gold medalists for China
Medalists at the 2010 Asian Games
Medalists at the 2014 Asian Games
Artistic swimmers at the 2019 World Aquatics Championships
21st-century Chinese women